Thomas Berry (born 1 May 2000) is an Australian rules footballer who plays for the Gold Coast Suns in the Australian Football League (AFL), having been initially drafted to the  with the 36th draft pick in the 2018 AFL draft. He is the brother of his former Brisbane teammate Jarrod Berry.

Early football
Berry played football for the Horsham Saints Football Club in the Wimmera Football League. He then played for the Greater Western Victoria Rebels in the NAB League, before being selected by Brisbane. He then played 20 games in the club's undefeated NEAFL side for 2019. He completed school while boarding at Ballarat Clarendon College.

AFL career
Berry debuted for Brisbane in the second round of the 2020 AFL season, against Fremantle at the Gabba. Berry picked up 9 disposals, 3 marks and a tackle. He was nominated for Mark of the Year in his debut match, "showing great courage in his first AFL game to take a mark like this with the commentary team comparing him to the great Jonathan Brown."

Following the 2022 AFL season, Berry requested a trade to  seeking greater opportunity, and was traded on 5 October.

Statistics
 Statistics are correct to the end of round 22, 2022 

|- style="background-color: #eaeaea"
! scope="row" style="text-align:center" | 2019
|  || 13 || 0 || — || — || — || — || — || — || — || — || — || — || — || — || — || —
|-
! scope="row" style="text-align:center" | 2020
|style="text-align:center;"|
| 13 || 6 || 0 || 2 || 16 || 25 || 41 || 10 || 12 || 0.0 || 0.3 || 2.7 || 4.2 || 6.8 || 1.7 || 2.0
|- style="background-color: #eaeaea"
! scope="row" style="text-align:center" | 2021
|  || 13 || 11 || 2 || 1 || 14 || 23 || 37 || 6 || 20 || 0.2 || 0.1 || 1.3 || 2.1 || 3.4 || 0.5 || 1.8
|-
! scope="row" style="text-align:center" | 2022
|style="text-align:center;"|
| 13 || 3 || 1 || 2 || 7 || 11 || 18 || 4 || 7 || 0.3 || 0.7 || 2.3 || 3.7 || 6.0 || 1.3 || 2.3
|- style="background:#EAEAEA; font-weight:bold; width:2em"
| scope="row" text-align:center class="sortbottom" colspan=3 | Career
| 20
| 3
| 5
| 37
| 59
| 96
| 20
| 39
| 0.2
| 0.3
| 1.9
| 3.0
| 4.8
| 1.0
| 2.0
|}

References

External links
 
 
 

2000 births
Living people
Australian rules footballers from Victoria (Australia)
Brisbane Lions players
Greater Western Victoria Rebels players